General Post Office, a colonial-era building situated on 141 King William Street on the north-west corner of King William Street and Victoria Square, is the former General Post Office for South Australia, Australia, Postal services operated from the building between 6 May 1872 and 11 October 2019.

Construction
The original building was constructed in the period 1867–1872, and was the most expensive building constructed to that time by the colonial government in South Australia. Prince Alfred, The Duke of Edinburgh, was involved in laying the foundation stone. It is associated with several architects of note, including Edmund Wright, Edward John Woods, Edward Angus Hamilton and Robert G. Thomas It was constructed from Glen Osmond and Glen Ewin stone, and ornamented with Bath limestone.

The clock tower was officially named Victoria Tower by Prince Alfred on 1 November 1867 when he laid the foundation stone. The capstone was put in place at a ceremony on 25 May 1870.
The original plans had the tower somewhat taller, but R. G. Thomas was obliged to redesign it, as a cost saving measure.

New location
On 14 October 2019, Adelaide's GPO was relocated to the adjacent 'GPO Exchange' tower at 10 Franklin St. The original building is planned to be turned into a retail and dining hub, with a 15-storey, 285-room Westin hotel to be built above it.

Gallery

References

External links

Buildings and structures in Adelaide
Tourist attractions in Adelaide
History of Adelaide
South Australian places listed on the defunct Register of the National Estate
Neoclassical architecture in Australia
Adelaide
Commonwealth Heritage List places in South Australia